Olaug Hay (15 January 1902 – 9 January 2000) was a Norwegian politician for the Conservative Party.

Hay hailed from Hammerfest. She served as a deputy representative to the Norwegian Parliament from Finnmark during the term 1954–1957.

References

1902 births
2000 deaths
Conservative Party (Norway) politicians
Deputy members of the Storting
Finnmark politicians
People from Hammerfest